Pseudogobio guilinensis is a species of cyprinid endemic to China and Vietnam.

References

Pseudogobio
Fish described in 1977